The sixteenth series of the British medical drama television series Casualty commenced airing in the United Kingdom on BBC One on 15 September 2001 and finished on 29 June 2002. It saw another increase, this time to 40 episodes. On 30 March 2002, Episode 350 had to be shown on BBC Two, due to some schedule changes on BBC One resulting from the death of Queen Elizabeth The Queen Mother earlier that day.

Cast

Main characters 

Jan Anderson as Chloe Hill (until episode 20)
Adjoa Andoh as Colette Griffiths
Ian Bleasdale as Josh Griffiths
Louise Brealey as Roxy Bird (from episode 32)

Robert Gwilym as Max Gallagher (until episode 36)
Kelly Harrison as Nikki Marshall (from episode 1)
Ben Keaton as Spencer (until episode 40)
Ian Kelsey as Patrick Spiller (until episode 28)
Kwame Kwei-Armah as Fin Newton
Martina Laird as Comfort Jones (from episode 1)
Judy Loe as Jan Goddard (episodes 3−40)
Simon MacCorkindale as Harry Harper (from episode 37)
Will Mellor as Jack Vincent
Dan Rymer as Dillon Cahill (from episode 1)
Zita Sattar as Anna Paul
Cathy Shipton as Lisa "Duffy" Duffin
Christine Stephen-Daly as Lara Stone (from episode 3)
Derek Thompson as Charlie Fairhead
Lee Warburton as Tony Vincent (from episode 11)

Recurring characters 

Arthur Caulfield as Ben Lewis (episodes 3−12)
Janet Dibley as Amanda Lewis (until episode 12)
Henry Ian Cusick as Jason (episodes 3−18)
Emily Dormer as Gilly (episodes 24−30)
Bob Mason as Jeff McGuire (episodes 1−9 and 30)
Scott Cowan as Jake Bower (episodes 1−21)
Ben Alsford as Peter Bower (episodes 1−21)
Lisa Palfrey as Melanie Collier (from episode 37)
Amy Robbins as Rachel James (episodes 1−15)
Chad Shepherd as Rob Jones (episodes 4−35)

Guest characters 

Christine Adams as Melanie Phillips (episode 21)
Morag Siller as Leona (episode 10)
Fiona Gillies as Philippa Kinross (episodes 14−19)
Dorian Healy as David Collier (episodes 37−40)
Charis Thomas as Natalie McKay (episodes 2 and 14−15)
Oliver Trestain as Kenny Wilson (episodes 1 and 6)
Tracey Saunders as Lynn Oldfield (episodes 2−7)
Christopher Scoular as Philip Greenwood (episodes 3 and 8)
Tom Fisher as Al (episodes 4 and 16)
Tarek Ramini as PC Russell (episodes 4−21)
Chrissie Cotterill as Shirley (episodes 12 and 14)
Danny McCall as Greg James (episodes 15 and 16)
Ashley Miller as WPC Paula Newcombe (episodes 16−38)
Sheena Irving as Gemma Harvey (episodes 25−27)
Michael Praed as Chris Meredith (from episode 32)
Gillian Taylforth as Justine Walker MP (episodes 33−34)
Melissa Pryer as Liza Davies (episode 36)
Natalie Glover as Emma Davies (episode 36)
Frankie Carson as Jordan Harper (episode 37)
George Irving as Anton Meyer (episode 39)
Nick Tizzard as PC McCormack (episode 40)

Episodes

Notes

References

External links
 Casualty series 16 at the Internet Movie Database

16
2001 British television seasons
2002 British television seasons